The Buzz (Jack "JJ" Jameson) is a fictional character appearing in American comic books published by Marvel Comics. The character appeared in the Spider-Girl comic book series. JJ is the grandson of J. Jonah Jameson and the son of John Jameson.

Publication history
First appearing in the MC2 comic book series Spider-Girl, the Buzz went on to have his own limited series.

Fictional character biography
Jack Jameson, or JJ to his friends, accompanied his grandfather, J. Jonah Jameson, C.E.O. of Jameson Communications (publisher of the Daily Bugle) to a demonstration of Project Human Fly. The project's goal was to create body armor that would grant the wearer superpowers. The staff of the project included Dr. Marla Jameson (Jonah's wife), biophysicist Dr. Sonja Jade and Robert Douglas, grandson of the late Joseph "Robbie" Robertson. It was then that JJ first met Buzz Bannon, a former Navy SEAL and the test pilot for the Human Fly armor. They quickly became friends. While JJ and Buzz were in the gym, Buzz received a message that he needed to attend a meeting about the Human Fly project, but it was a trap.

Dr. Sonja Jade turned out to be a traitor who took Marla, Jonah Jameson and Buzz Bannon hostage and was stealing the project files and armor. While her minions went to retrieve the armor, JJ and Richie Robertson discovered what was happening and triggered a fire alarm. Buzz used the distraction to overcome most of his guards, but he was shot in the abdomen during the fight, while Richie was beaten unconscious. Buzz and JJ manage to escape and get to the armor.

A few moments later, the Human Fly rescues the hostages and went after the villains, but Dr. Jade got away due to an explosion. Later on that evening Buzz Bannon's body was discovered. JJ had donned the armor, but he could not tell his grandfather (who, in a fit of rage, accused the Human Fly of killing Bannon). JJ knew that the body armor was the only way he could get revenge for Buzz's death. He kept the armor a secret from his grandfather and, in memory of his friend, called himself the Buzz.

Richie, having seen Buzz die, agreed to help JJ with his armor from an electronics equipped van. With Richie's help, the Buzz was able to find and defeat Dr. Jade.

The Buzz soon met Spider-Girl, but she was leery of him since she read in the Daily Bugle that he was a murderer. Buzz managed to convince her that he wasn't, and later helped her form a new team of New Warriors.

Powers and abilities
Jack Jameson has no superhuman abilities of his own, but his armor gives him superhuman strength and flight. His gauntlets can fire blasts of electricity (his "Bug Zapper") or ribbons of adhesive polymer (his "Fly Paper"). His goggles give him 360-degree vision.  

The neural interface of the armor is bonded specifically to Jameson and will not work for anyone else.

References

External links 
 

Characters created by Tom DeFalco
Characters created by Ron Frenz
Comics characters introduced in 2000
Fictional characters from New York City
Marvel Comics titles
Marvel Comics 2